Frankland River may refer to:

 Frankland River, Western Australia, a town in Western Australia
 Frankland River (Western Australia), a river in Western Australia
 Frankland River (North West Tasmania), a river in Tasmania